Copper Mountain is a  mountain summit located in Mount Rainier National Park in Pierce County of Washington state. Part of the Cascade Range, it is situated near the base of the Success Cleaver, overlooking Indian Henry's Hunting Ground. Its nearest neighbor is Iron Mountain  to the south, and its nearest higher peak is Pyramid Peak,  to the northeast. The summit provides views of Mount Rainier, Mount Adams, Mount St. Helens, and peaks of the Tatoosh Range. Precipitation runoff from Copper Mountain drains into Tahoma Creek and Fishers Horn Pipe Creek, which are both tributaries of the Nisqually River. There were great hopes in the late 1800s that mines on Mount Rainier could be a source of precious metals such as copper, silver, and gold. This landform's toponym was officially adopted in 1932 by the United States Board on Geographic Names.

Climate

Copper Mountain is located in the marine west coast climate zone of western North America. Most weather fronts originate in the Pacific Ocean, and travel northeast toward the Cascade Mountains. As fronts approach, they are forced upward by the peaks of the Cascade Range (Orographic lift), causing them to drop their moisture in the form of rain or snowfall onto the Cascades. As a result, the west side of the Cascades experiences high precipitation, especially during the winter months in the form of snowfall. During winter months, weather is usually cloudy, but, due to high pressure systems over the Pacific Ocean that intensify during summer months, there is often little or no cloud cover during the summer.

See also

 Geography of Washington (state)
 Geology of the Pacific Northwest

References

External links
 Weather forecast: Copper Mountain
 National Park Service web site: Mount Rainier National Park

Cascade Range
Mountains of Pierce County, Washington
Mountains of Washington (state)
Mount Rainier National Park